A cephalotribe was a medical instrument used in obstetrics to crush the skull of stillborn fetuses (cephalotripsy). It was used in cases of obstructed labor (dystocia) to aid delivery.

See also
 Cranioclast
 Puerperal fever
 Instruments used in general surgery

References

Surgical instruments